Billingham Biomass Power Station is a planned biomass power station, that is to be built on the River Tees at Billingham. It is to be built on the site of the former coal-fired North Tees Power Station. The station will have a generating capacity of 45 megawatts (MW).

The station was granted planning permission in October 2009. The construction of the power station will cost £200 million, and is expected to be completed by 2012. The project was initiated by Gaia Power, who chose Aker Solutions to develop the project.

As at October 2017 the old power station site remains undeveloped.

References

Power stations in North East England
Buildings and structures in County Durham
Proposed biofuel power stations
Proposed renewable energy power stations in England
Billingham